Eva Renée Agneta Nyberg, (born 17 May 1966) is a Swedish television presenter and journalist. She made her television debut at the TV4 news show in the early 1990s. She then worked for TV3 until 2014  presenting several shows such as Blåsningen, Byggfällan, 45 minuter and the Miljonjakten. Since September 2014, Nyberg is an employee at TV4 hosting the antique show "Bytt är bytt".

Nyberg is married to TV4 television presenter David Hellenius and the couple have a son who was born in 2006.

TV programs
Byggfällan, TV3 (2010)
Blåsningen, TV3 (2010)
Cirkus Zlatan, TV3 (May 2008)
Nyberg & Törnblom, TV3 (2007-)
Singalong, TV3 (2006-)
45 minuter, TV3
Klassfesten, TV3
Vänner för livet, TV3
Vilda djur?,TV3
Slussen 22.00, TV3
Tur i kärlek, TV4
Stora famnen
Bytt är bytt, TV4 (2014-)

References

External links 

 

1966 births
Swedish television hosts
Swedish women television presenters
Living people